Patrick Bristow (born September 26, 1962) is an American actor, comedian and director. He is best known for playing Peter Barnes on Ellen (1994-1998), and Patrick on The Suite Life of Zack and Cody (2005-2008), and for the film Pain & Gain (2013).

Life and career 
Bristow was born in Los Angeles. He appeared as Peter on Ellen. His TV guest-star roles include Seinfelds "The Wig Master", his recurring role as the Machiavellian Troy on Mad About You, and Larry David's choreographer on Curb Your Enthusiasm. He has also guest-starred on Malcolm in the Middle, Friends, CSI, The Minor Accomplishments of Jackie Woodman, The Larry Sanders Show, Head Case, The Suite Life of Zack & Cody, and the animated series King of the Hill and Family Guy.

Bristow appeared as himself in episodes of both the UK and U.S. versions of the improvisational show Whose Line Is It Anyway? and on "Celebrity Apprentice." He is the stage show director and host for the Jim Henson Company's Puppet Up!, which combines comedic improvisation with puppetry, and which he co-created with Brian Henson.

Bristow has been nominated for a Los Angeles Drama Critics Circle Award, a Los Angeles Stage Alliance Ovation Award, and took home a Back Stage West Garland Award for originating the role of Bob in The Breakup Notebook: The Lesbian Musical, which received the 2006 Ovation Award for World Premiere Musical.

His live show, Stuffed and Unstrung, was also nominated for a Drama Desk award in 2010 in the category of "Unique Theatrical Experience." Bristow is also an alumnus of The Groundlings, where he still occasionally performs improvisation comedy.

His film work includes Austin Powers: International Man of Mystery as a tour guide at Virtucon, the cult camp-classic Showgirls, So I Married an Axe Murderer, The Longest Yard, The Twilight of the Golds, Jimmy and Judy,  and Pain & Gain.

In 2010, he appeared off-Broadway at the Union Square Theatre as director and stage host of the revamped "Puppet Up", renamed "Stuffed and Unstrung" (co-created with Brian Henson) for its New York debut.

Personal life
A Los Angeles native, Bristow is the third child of former performers Frank Bristow and Patricia O'Kane.

Coupled since 1994, Bristow resides in L.A. with his husband Andrew Nicastro, the former director of global production for Steven Spielberg's Shoah Foundation. The two were married in April 2010 in a ceremony in Old Greenwich, Connecticut, attended by friends and family.

Filmography

References

External links

1962 births
Living people
Male actors from Los Angeles
American male comedians
American male film actors
American male television actors
Back Stage West Garland Award recipients
American gay actors
Gay comedians
LGBT people from California
20th-century American male actors
21st-century American male actors
Comedians from California
20th-century American comedians
21st-century American comedians
American LGBT comedians